Group A of the 2001 Fed Cup Americas Zone Group II was one of four pools in the Americas Zone Group II of the 2001 Fed Cup. Three teams competed in a round robin competition, with each team being assigned to its respective play-off region.

Puerto Rico vs. Bolivia

Bolivia vs. Jamaica

Puerto Rico vs. Jamaica

See also
Fed Cup structure

References

External links
 Fed Cup website

2001 Fed Cup Americas Zone